If You Don't Buy This Book, We'll Kill This Dog: Life, Laughs, Love and Death at National Lampoon is an American book that was published in 1994. It is a history based on the author Matty Simmons' involvement with the National Lampoon magazine and its various spin-offs, including the film Animal House.

During the early years of National Lampoon in the 1970s, Matty Simmons was the chairman of Twenty First Century Communications, Inc, of which the original National Lampoon, Inc. was a subsidiary company. From 1976–1977, he was the publisher of the magazine and from 1978 for a period of time, he was the publishing director.

References

 Amazon listing

Books about National Lampoon
1994 non-fiction books